Rubtsovsky may refer to:

 Rubtsovsky District, Russia
 Rubtsovskaya (Moscow Metro)